My World, My Way is the fourth studio album by American rapper Silkk the Shocker, released on February 27, 2001 on No Limit Records and Priority Records in the United States. The album was produced by a variety of producers including Donald XL Robertson and Myke Diesel.

Singles
"He Did That", produced by Donald XL Robertson made it to #13 on the Hot R&B/Hip Hop Singles & Tracks. 
"That's Cool" was a huge success making it to #8 on the Top/Hip Hop Singles & Tracks.

Track listing

Sample credits 

"That's Cool"
"Human Beat Box" by Fat Boys
"Seem Like a Thug"
"How Deep Is Your Love" by Dru Hill feat. Redman

Charts

Weekly charts

Year-end charts

Singles
He Did That

Pop Lockin

That's Cool

Personnel 
Credits adapted from Allmusic.

C-Murder - Composer, Guest Artist  
Jodi Cohen - Design  
Myke Diesel  - Composer, Producer  
DJ Ron - Producer  
Erica Fox - Performer,   Composer  
Goldie Loc  Composer, Performer, Primary Artist  
Ke'Noe  Producer  
M.A.C. - Composer  
Master P - Composer, Executive Producer, Guest Artist  
Mystikal - Composer, Guest Artist, Performer, Primary Artist  
Donald XL Robertson - Producer  
Slay Sean - Composer  
Short Circuit - Composer  
Silkk the Shocker  - Performer, Composer 
Snoop Dogg -  Guest Artist, Performer 
Soopafly  - Producer  
Carlos Stephens - Producer  
Suga Bear -  Producer, Vocals  
K. Taylor - Composer  
Trina - Featured Artist, Primary Artist

References

2001 albums
Albums produced by Soopafly
Silkk the Shocker albums
No Limit Records albums
Priority Records albums